The German School of Barcelona is a German international school in Esplugues de Llobregat, Catalonia, Spain, in the Barcelona metropolitan area.

This private school aims to successfully integrate the German children with the Spanish ones, and these into the German schooling system, so that all pupils are enabled at the conclusion of school to speak both languages vernacularly. They are guided during a 12-year tuition program together, after which they are faced with a final examination named Abitur, which is recognized on a global level. For those who do not succeed or plan on going through the whole preparatory school, secondary or general school systems are also offered.

Kindergarten 
The German School of Barcelona also possesses a German-oriented kindergarten, in which children participate for three years. The preschoolers are divided in different groups according to their languages, with the main language being German. This institution aids the children in a social manner, and supports and develops their creative skills. In their third year children will participate in preschool-lessons. German knowledge is not required for acceptance.

Elementary school 
The school's elementary section lasts four years. German and Spanish or Catalan children are taught in the same classes and receive one daily hour of Spanish tuition. Special classes for those who appeal to Catalan lessons are available.

Secondary and preparatory school 
After a two-year-long survey (grades 5 and 6), the children are appointed to different educational levels: Gymnasium/preparatory school (grades 7–12), Realschule/simple secondary school (grades 7-10), or Hauptschule/general school (grades 7–9).

New secondary school 
At the German School of Barcelona, there is a special offering for pupils entering fifth grade that do not speak fluent German. They are sent to a special class were students with the same knowledge are found, so that they can arrive to the ideal German level quicker.

Lessons for different languages 
German and Spanish: Grades 1–12
English:            Grades 5–12
Catalan: Grades 1–12 (until 9th grade obligatory)
French: Grades 9–12 (optional)

Notable pupils 
 Jordi Pujol
 Juan Antonio Samaranch
 Antoni Tàpies
 Òscar Tusquets
 Àlex Brendemühl
 Álvaro Soler

References

External links
 

Schools in the Province of Barcelona
Esplugues de Llobregat
International schools in Catalonia
Barcelona
Private schools in Spain